Wuhe Township is a township under the administration of Shangcheng County, Henan, China. , it has 16 villages under its administration:
Wuhe Village
Zengwa Village
Macao Village
Guomiao Village
Zhangdian Village
Qizhongwan Village
Fanqi Village
Chenwa Village
Gaojiafan Village
Shenfan Village
Zengyoufang Village
Liujiafan Village
Wan'an Village
Qingtang'ao Village
Lianhuashan Village
Kaijuesi Village

References 

Township-level divisions of Henan
Shangcheng County